Hominid dispersals in Europe refers to the colonisation of the European continent by various species of hominid, including hominins and archaic and modern humans.

Short and repetitive migrations of archaic humans before 1 million years ago suggest that their residence in Europe was not permanent at the time.  Colonisation of Europe in prehistory was not achieved in one immigrating wave, but instead through multiple dispersal events.  Most of these instances in Eurasia were limited to 40th parallel north.  Besides the findings from East Anglia, the first constant presence of humans in Europe begins 500,000–600,000 years ago. However, this presence was limited to western Europe, not reaching places like the Russian plains, until 200,000–300,000 years ago.  The exception to this was discovered in East Anglia, England, where hominids briefly inhabited 700,000 years ago. Prior to arriving in Europe, the source of hominids appeared to be East Africa, where stone tools and hominid fossils are the most abundant and recorded.  Arising in Europe at least 400,000 years ago, the Neanderthal hominids (a descendant of Homo heidelbergensis) would become more stable residents of the continent, until another descendant of H. heidelbergensis, H. sapiens, would arrive about 50,000 years ago, leading to the extinction of the Neanderthals about 37,000 years ago.

Pre-human hominids 

In the early Miocene, Europe had a subtropical climate and was intermittently connected to Africa by land bridges. At the same time, Africa was becoming more arid, prompting the dispersal of its tropical fauna—including primates—north into Europe. Apes first appear in the European fossil record 17 million years ago with Griphopithecus. The closely related Kenyapithecus is also known from fossils in Germany, Slovakia and Turkey. Both Griphopithecus and Kenyapithecus are considered likely to be ancestral to the great apes. From 13 million to 9 million years ago, hominids flourished in Europe and underwent an adaptive radiation as they diversified in response to a gradually cooling climate. Middle Miocene European hominids include Pierolapithecus, Anoiapithecus, Dryopithecus, Hispanopithecus, and Rudapithecus. The diversity and early appearance of great apes in Europe has led some scientists to theorise that hominids in fact evolved there, before dispersing "back to Africa" in the Middle Miocene.

Around 9 million years ago most of Europe's hominid species fell victim to the Vallesian crisis, an extinction event caused by the disappearance of the continent's forests. Some hominid species survived the event: Orepithecus, which became isolated in forest refugia; and Ouranopithecus, which adapted to the open environments of the late Miocene. However, both were extinct by 7 million years ago.

In 2017, a reanalysis of Graecopithecus fossils from Greece and Bulgaria, previously associated with Ouranopithecus, concluded that the species was in fact a hominin dating to just after the last common ancestor of humans and chimpanzees (about 7.2 million years ago). The authors suggested that the origins of the human lineage were therefore in the Mediterranean, not Africa. Others are sceptical of their claims.

Although subtropical conditions returned to Europe in the Pliocene (5.33–2.58 million years ago), there are no known fossil hominids from this period.

Archaic humans

Homo erectus populations lived in southeastern Europe by 1.8 million years ago.

The most archaic human fossils from the Middle Pleistocene (780,000–125,000 years ago) have been found in Europe.  Remains of Homo heidelbergensis have been found as far north as the Atapuerca Mountains in Gran Dolina, Spain, and the oldest specimens can be dated from 850,000 to 200,000 years ago.

Neanderthals evolved from a branch of Homo heidelbergensis that migrated to Europe during the Middle Pleistocene.  Neanderthal populations date back at least as far as 400,000 years ago in the Atapuerca Mountains, Spain.  While lacking the robustness attributed to west European Neanderthal morphology, other populations did inhabit parts of eastern Europe and western Asia.  Between 45,000–35,000 years ago, modern humans (Homo sapiens) replaced all Neanderthal populations in Europe anatomically and genetically.  This is evident in the transfer and combination of technology and culture.

Anatomically modern humans 

The recent expansion of anatomically modern humans reached Europe around 40,000 years ago, from Central Asia and the Middle East, as a result of cultural adaption to big game hunting of sub-glacial steppe fauna.
Neanderthals were present both in the Middle East and in Europe, and the arriving populations of anatomically modern humans (also known as "Cro-Magnon" or European early modern humans) have interbred with Neanderthal populations to a limited degree.

Modern human remains dating to 43–45,000 years ago have been discovered in Italy and Britain, with the remains found of those that reached the European Russian Arctic 40,000 years ago.

The composition of European populations was later altered by further migrations, notably the Neolithic expansion from the Middle East, and still later the Chalcolithic population movements associated with Indo-European expansion.

The modern indigenous population of Europe is composed of three major foundational populations,
dubbed "Western Hunter-Gatherers" (WHG), "Early European Farmers" (EEF) and "Ancient North Eurasian" (ANE).
WHG represents the remnant of the original Cro-Magnon population after they re-peopled Europe after the Last Glacial Maximum.
EEF represents the introgression of Near Eastern populations during the Neolithic Revolution, and ANE is associated both with the Mesolithic Uralic expansion to Northern Europe and the Indo-European expansion to Europe in the Chalcolithic.

Pressures favoring migration 

Homo ergaster specimens indicate a change toward a diet more reliant on animal products, evident by greater encephalization with higher energy requirements.  This transition to becoming more carnivorous affected the way of life unlike primates before.  Archaeological evidence of cut bones from large mammals and broken stone tools increasing in frequency support this increasing trend.  To meet increasing demand of calories, the range of hominids would have expanded, making the necessary hunting versus prior scavenging possible.  It is believed that the adjustments required to meet these new demands would expand the home range size eight to ten times.  Range could also increase or decrease in size due to environmental changes.  A more recent example is absence of humans in Britain during the last glacial maximum which ended in the Late Pleistocene, 10,000 years ago.  At this time, Russia had an influx of people following the major prey species shifting to this region.  It has been argued that Neanderthals', and previous hominids', expansion northward were limited by lacking proper thermoregulation.  Behavioural adaptations such as clothes-making to overcome the cold is evident in archaeological finds.  The potential to expand also grew with the Neanderthal reaching the status of top carnivores.  These humans could fear less during expansion, without the worry of other predators. The desire to push into these northern areas was influenced by this requirement to eat a lot of meat to satisfy the human brain which uses 20% of the body's energy.   Larger game for hunting is available the closer you are to the poles.

See also 
 History of Europe
 Human migration
 Early human migrations
 Historical migration

References

External links 
 The Settlement and Colonization of Europe

Prehistoric Europe